Hougang Secondary School (abbreviation: HGSS)  is a co-educational secondary school in Hougang, in  northern Singapore. The school opened on 2 January 2001 at 58 Lowland Road and relocated to its permanent site at 2 Hougang Street 93 on 20 December 2001.

References

Educational institutions established in 2001
Secondary schools in Singapore
2001 establishments in Singapore